Statistics of Dhivehi League in the 1989 season.

Overview
Club Lagoons won the championship.

References
 RSSSF

Dhivehi League seasons
Maldives
Maldives
football